Karlsvik is a locality situated in Luleå Municipality, Norrbotten County, Sweden with 256 inhabitants in 2010.

References

External links
Karlsvik at Luleå Municipality

Populated places in Luleå Municipality
Norrbotten